The Riley Bloom series is the spin-off of the fantasy series The Immortals by Alyson Noel first published in 2010 in the United States about the afterlife of Riley Bloom, the sister of Ever Bloom (lead character of The Immortals).

Riley Bloom is a twelve-year-old girl who was about to become a teenager before she died in a car accident. She didn't cross over to heaven after the death of her and her family as she wanted to stay with her big sister - Ever Bloom - who was neither dead or alive after the accident as she had become immortal. Later, due to the force of her sister, she walks over the bridge to heaven. There she meets her Mom, Dad and her pet dog Buttercup. And it's from here the journey starts.

The Riley Bloom Series consists of:

 Radiance (August 31, 2010)
 Shimmer (March 15, 2011)
 Dreamland (September 13, 2011)
 Whisper (April 24, 2012)

Synopsis 

This book follows Riley Bloom. Riley and her family died in a car accident, though her sister became immortal. Her mom and dad and her dog Buttercup were crossing the bridge but she didn't because a part of her longed to stay with her surviving sister. When Ever learned that her little sister was stuck between two worlds, Riley crossed the bridge and entered the Here & Now after Ever told her to move on.

Radiance 

Riley Bloom left her sister, Ever, in the world of the living and crossed the bridge into the afterlife - a place called Here, where time is always Now. Riley and her dog, Buttercup, have been reunited with her parents and just settled into a nice, relaxing death when she's summoned before The Council. They let her in on one condition - the afterlife isn't just an eternity of leisure; Riley has to work. She's been assigned a job, Soul Catcher, and a teacher, Bodhi, a curious boy whom she can't quite figure out.

Riley, Bodhi, and Buttercup return to earth for her first assignment, a Radiant Boy who's been haunting a castle in England for centuries. Many Soul Catchers have tried to get him to cross the bridge and failed.

Shimmer 
Having solved the matter of the Radiant Boy, Riley, Buttercup, and Bodhi are enjoying a well deserved vacation. When Riley comes across a young ghost named Rebecca, Riley soon learns Rebecca's not at all what she sees. As the daughter of a former plantation owner, she is furious about being murdered during a slave revolt in 1733. Mired in her own anger, Rebecca is keeping the ghosts who died along with her trapped in their worst memories.

Dreamland 
Riley's finding that the afterlife can be a lonely place when all you do is focus on work. So.. she goes to the place where dreams happen, hoping to find a way to contact her sister, Ever. She meets the director, who tells her about the two ways to send dreams. As a Dream Jumper, a person can jump into a dreamer's dream, share a message, and participate. As a Dreamweaver, an entire dream can be created in a studio and sent to the dreamer. But dreamweaving was outlawed decades ago, and the studio was boarded up. Thinking that it's her only way to reach out to her sister, Riley goes in search of the old studio. There she finds a ghost boy, who's been creating and sending nightmares to people for years. In order to stop him and reach out to Ever, Riley is going to have to confront and overcome her own fears.

Whisper 
This would be the most challenging Soul Catch for Riley as she has to catch the soul of a Roman Gladiator who's called the Pillar of Doom. For this Riley has to go through a makeover which would make her a teenager she has always wished for. Riley meets Messalina who introduces her to a cute boy named Dacian.

References 

Fantasy novel series
Heaven in popular culture
Novels about the afterlife
Fiction about immortality